M. Madan Babu  is an Indian-American  computational biologist and bioinformatician. He is the endowed chair in biological data science and director of the center of excellence for data-driven discovery at St. Jude Children’s Research Hospital. Previously, he served as a programme leader at the MRC Laboratory of Molecular Biology (LMB).

Early life and education 
Babu grew up in Chennai, India. He became interested in learning to program as a young child when his father brought home a personal computer. Babu was introduced to biotechnology as a high school student. He obtained his Bachelor of Technology degree from Anna University, where he was introduced to the field of computational biology. Babu obtained his PhD in computational genomics at the University of Cambridge supervised by Sarah Teichmann in 2004.

Career and research
After his PhD, Babu was a postdoctoral researcher at the National Center for Biotechnology Information (NCBI), at the National Institute of Health (NIH) in Bethesda, Maryland with Aravind L. Iyer. In 2006, he became a group leader at the MRC Laboratory of Molecular Biology in Cambridge, UK. In July 2020, Babu joined the faculty of St. Jude Children’s Research Hospital as the endowed chair in biological data science in the structural biology department and director of the center of excellence for data-driven discovery.

Babu's research focuses on understanding the regulation of cellular systems at varying scales, including molecular, system, and genomic levels. He also studies the effects of such regulation on genome evolution. In particular, his research group studies G protein-coupled receptors and intrinsically disordered proteins using a combination of computational biology and experimental biology approaches.

 Babu serves as chief editor of the journal Molecular Systems Biology.

Awards and honours
2009: EMBO young investigator, European Molecular Biology Organization  (EMBO) 
2010: Won the Early Career Research Award from the Biochemical Society
2011: Awarded the Balfour Lecture by the Genetics Society
2011: Won the Royal Society of Chemistry Molecular BioSystems Award 
 2014: Awarded the Colworth Medal by the Biochemical Society
2014: Awarded the research prize by the Lister Institute of Preventive Medicine
2014: Won the Protein Society Protein Science Young Investigator Award 
2015: Awarded the Francis Crick Lecture by the Royal Society
2016: Elected a member of the European Molecular Biology Organization
2017: Elected a Fellow of the Royal Society of Chemistry (FRSC)
 2018: Won the Blavatnik Award for Young Scientists from the New York Academy of Sciences
 2018: Won the ISCB Innovator Award from the International Society for Computational Biology (ISCB)
 2019: Won the EMBO Gold Medal
2021: Elected a Fellow of the Academy of Medical Sciences

References 

Computational biologists
Indian bioinformaticians
Living people
Academics of the University of Cambridge
Fellows of the Royal Society of Chemistry
Members of the European Molecular Biology Organization
Year of birth missing (living people)
People from Chennai
Anna University alumni
Fellows of the Academy of Medical Sciences (United Kingdom)